The Ship's Company Theatre is a professional theatre company based in Parrsboro, Nova Scotia.

Founded in 1984 by Michael Fuller and Mary Vingoe, the Ship's Company Theatre features productions of Canadian works, with an emphasis on new works from Maritime writers. It often commissions its own productions, and a number have been remounted in other theatres across Canada.

The theatre's 14-week production season runs from July to October and features three mainstage plays; a second stage for "new and emerging artists" from Atlantic Canada; a series of Monday-night concerts and a kid's stage. The box office is located at 18 Lower Main Street, Parrsboro.

The theatre's current artistic producer is Richie Wilcox.

Due to COVID-19, the 2020 season will take place online.

Name
The name "Ship's Company" is in reference to the theatre's first (and continuing) home in Parrsboro on board the MV Kipawo, one of Canada's longest-serving ferries, which is now permanently beached on the western shore of Parrsboro Harbour.  The theatre company made use of the ship after a museum proposal fell through in the mid-1980s.  A 2004 expansion of the theatre's facilities saw a large performance hall built with the MV Kipawo being fully enclosed in the outdoor lobby.

Notes

References
 The Doers and Dreamers Complete Tourist Travel Guide to Nova Scotia
 Official Website.
 Kipawo Heritage society

External links
Official Website

Theatre companies in Nova Scotia
Theatres in Nova Scotia
Tourist attractions in Cumberland County, Nova Scotia
Buildings and structures in Cumberland County, Nova Scotia
1984 establishments in Nova Scotia